Tholos de El Romeral, situated  north east of the town of Antequera (Andalusia), is one of the most important examples of Neolithic architecture in southern Europe. Tholos de El Romeral, also known as Cueva de Romeral (Cave of Romeral) and Dolmen de Romeral, is a megalithic burial site built circa 1800 BCE. It is one of three tombs in region, the others being Dolmen de Menga and Dolmen de Viera, both situated to the south west.

In 2016, the dolmens of Menga, Viera, and El Romeral were all inscribed as a UNESCO World Heritage Site under the name "Antequera Dolmens Site".

Date 

As late as the 20th century it was believed that the three megalithic tombs in the area (Dolmen de Menga, Dolmen de Viera and Tholos de El Romeral) originated from the same period. However subsequent research supports widely spaced dates between the first two (around 3800 BCE) and the construction of Tholos de El Romeral which is now thought to have been built around 1800 BCE.  It is recognised and attributed to the wider culture of the Los Millares, which had its centre more than 200 kilometres to the east. The main reasons for this are the different stone materials used and the differing floor plans of the chambers, as the other two tombs have rectangular chambers.

Architecture

Tholos de El Romeral is a chambered tomb covered by a mound. It consists of a long corridor with drystone walls made of small stones and a ceilings made of megalithic slabs. The corridor culminates with two consecutive round beehive-like chambers. The floor of the corridor and main chamber are made of packed earth. The second chamber is linked to the first by a rectangular corridor (and is not accessible to the public). Bones and grave goods were found within the dolmen.

Although it is believed that these megalithic buildings had different uses (tombs, temples, etc.) the Romeral Dolmen is certainly a burial site because human remains, shells, and two types of ceramics were found within it.

Gallery

See also
 Megalithic Monuments of Alcalar
 Dolmen de la Pastora
 Tholos do Barro
 Dolmen of Montelirio
 Valencina de la Concepción
 Prehistoric Iberia
 Bell Beaker culture
 Treasury of Atreus

External links 

 The Modern Antiquarian
 The Megalithic Portal
 Historia de la Arquitectura en España (page in Spanish)

Prehistoric sites in Spain
Buildings and structures in Antequera
Chalcolithic sites of Europe
World Heritage Sites in Spain
Archaeological sites in Andalusia
2nd-millennium BC architecture
Neolithic Spain
Bronze Age sites in Europe